The Lebanon men's national under-19 basketball team is the junior men's national basketball team, administered by Lebanese Basketball Federation, that represents Lebanon in international under-19 and under-18 men's basketball competitions.

History

World Cup Qualification

The team has reached the 2022 FIBA U18 Asian Championship Semi-Finals that brought the nation a ticket to its second FIBA Under-19 Basketball World Cup appearance.

Tournament records

World Cup

Asia Championship

See also
Sport in Lebanon
Lebanon men's national basketball team
Lebanon men's national under-17 basketball team
Lebanon women's national basketball team
Lebanon women's national under-17 basketball team

References

External links
Official website

National
Men's national under-19 basketball teams
Basketball